The Queensland Australian Football League (QAFL) is an Australian rules football competition organised by the AFL Queensland, contested by  clubs from South East Queensland.

Previously known as the Queensland Football League (QFL), Queensland Australian National Football League (QANFL), Queensland Australian Football League (QAFL) and AFL Queensland State League (AFLQSL), the QAFL is the premier semi-professional competition in Queensland.

Since its inception, more than fifty teams have played in the premiership competition. The premier division currently features 12 teams from as far north from Noosa on the Sunshine Coast, throughout the Brisbane Metropolitan Area and as far south as Palm Beach on the Gold Coast near the New South Wales border. The league is headquartered in Brisbane. However teams from the Gold Coast and the Sunshine Coast have dominated the competition since 2015.

History
Prior to formation of the QFL, a precursor existed in the form of the Queensland Football Association (QFA) between 1880 to 1890. However poor alignment with the Victorian Football Association, a failure to secure intercolonial tests and its failure to rein in the popularity of rugby saw its ultimate demise. Following a decade long hiatus in the sport, Australian rules saw renewed interest during the Federation of Australia and fans in Queensland at the turn of the century regrouped floating the idea of a new competition that would endure in the state.

The Queensland Football League (QFL) was formed in July 1903 at a meeting with 50 present at the South Brisbane Cycling Club and a total of 150 signed on as members. Unlike the previous league which affiliated with the VFA, this new body decided to affiliate with the Victorian Football League. Practice matches were held in August that year in the Botanical Gardens and attracted large crowds and interest. The first premiership was held in 1904 with most games being played at Queen's Park, a sporting facility within the grounds of the Brisbane Botanic Gardens.

From 1905 to 1914 games were regularly played at the Brisbane Cricket Ground. Clubs included Brisbanes, Locomotives, Ipswich, Citys, Valleys and Wynnum.

Between 1915 and 1919 the competition went into recess owing to World War I.  Since the inception of the QFL, more than fifty teams have played in the premiership competition.

In August 1927 at a meeting of the Australian National Football Council it was decided that each of the state leagues were to include the words 'Australian National' in their names.  Accordingly, the QFL was renamed the Queensland Australian National Football League (QANFL) and football continued a steady growth in Brisbane.

In 1964 the QANFL dropped the 'National' reference to their name and became the Queensland Australian Football League (QAFL), a limited liability company.

In the late 1970s and early 1980s, the QAFL saw a boom in popularity, boosted by televised matches it saw crowds of 500 to several thousand attending blockbuster matches, modest in comparison to attendances drawn in traditional football states but significant nonetheless. The QAFL and the Gold Coast league both competed directly with the VFL for local marketshare in 1982.

Brisbane Bears VFL Licence and QAFL-Cronin Consortium

With its popularity increasing, the QAFL began to seek a VFL licence. In 1985 the QAFL had decided that pushing for a Melbourne-based club to relocate to Brisbane. However after several failed attempts to relocate Melbourne clubs including Fitzroy and Richmond, it soon became evident that the VFL's preference was a new licence.

In 1986 the QAFL formed a consortium with Paul Cronin for a new VFL licence and the consortium won its bid for a new Brisbane based club. However the QAFL fell out with the Christopher Skase backed Bears when the decision was made to base the new club at Carrara on the Gold Coast instead of the QAFL's preferred venue, the Brisbane Cricket Ground. The decision would begin a bitter and long protracted battle between the QAFL and the Bears which was not resolved until 1991.

The admission of the Bears and the Gold Coast had a huge impact on the QAFL's crowds, with attendances falling from an average of 500 to just 50. Combined with the Bears poor on and off field performance the QAFL was severely weakened over the following years resulting in its voluntary liquidation in 1999.

2000: Restructure
In 2000 the QSFL was replaced by a new organisation, AFL Queensland (AFLQ). The new premiership competition was called the AFLQ State League.

Recent history
In November 2010 the AFL Queensland's Premier Division merged with AFL Canberra to form the North East Australian Football League, featuring all of its previous teams as well as the Gold Coast Suns and Brisbane Lions reserve teams in the Northern Conference of the league.

As a result, the QAFL was disbanded in favour of localised competitions throughout Queensland. The structural changes to the North East Australian Football League (NEAFL) competition at the end of the 2013 season resulted in several clubs being relegated from the NEAFL, giving rise to a rebirth of the QAFL. As of 2014, there are 10 clubs who compete in the QAFL, most of which are based in South-East Queensland. After spending the 2021 season in the VFL, Aspley rejoined the QAFL in time for the 2022 season.

Venues
 1904 – 1912: Queen's Park
 1905 – 1914: Brisbane Cricket Ground, Exhibition Ground
 1920 – 1950s:  Perry Park, Exhibition Ground for some games, including the 1950 interstate carnival
 1959 – 1971: Brisbane Cricket Ground
 1970s – 1980s: Windsor Park

Clubs

Current clubs (2022)

Club uniforms

Former clubs (Brisbane)

 Ascot
 Brisbane Lions (1997–current)
 Brisbane (1866–1887)
 Brisbane (1920–1929)
 City 
 Coorparoo Roos
 Kedron Lions
 Locomotives
 Mayne Tigers
 Norths
 North Brisbane Eagles (See Zillmere)
 Redland Sharks
 Sandgate Hawks
 Souths 
 South Brisbane 
 University of Queensland Students
 Valley
 Windsor-Zillmere Eagles (See Zillmere)
 West Brisbane Magpies (See Sherwood)
 Western Districts Magpies (See Sherwood)
 Workshops
 Yeronga
 Zillmere Eagles

Former clubs (Gold Coast)

 Gold Coast Suns
 Southport Sharks

Former clubs (Northern Territory)
 Northern Territory Thunder

Former clubs (Sunshine Coast)

 Caloundra Panthers

Premierships

List of premiers
The complete list of premiers teams is detailed below:
In 2010, the QAFL competition was disbanded and its teams became part of the NEAFL Northern conference.In 2014, the QAFL competition resumed with several former clubs of the NEAFL being relegated to the competition along with several newly promoted teams.

List of premiers (All Grades)
The complete list of premiers teams in all grades is detailed below.

(R) = Reserves team

Premierships by club (seniors)
Premiership tallies for the top Queensland football division:

Notes

See also

 Australian Rules football in Queensland
 AFL Queensland

References

External links
 AFL Queensland State website
 Official Facebook
 
 QAFF – Queensland footy history group
 Footynews Unofficial QAFL news and results

Australian rules football competitions in Queensland
Sport on the Gold Coast, Queensland
1904 establishments in Australia
Sports leagues established in 1904
Professional sports leagues in Australia